Roy Dunn (August 4, 1910 – June 10, 2000) was an American wrestler. He competed in the men's freestyle heavyweight at the 1936 Summer Olympics.

References

External links
 

1910 births
2000 deaths
American male sport wrestlers
Olympic wrestlers of the United States
Wrestlers at the 1936 Summer Olympics
People from Beaver County, Oklahoma
Sportspeople from Oklahoma